is a Japanese writer, film producer, director and former actor. He is known as Gaku Washio/GaoYellow in 2001's Super Sentai's series, Hyakujuu Sentai GaoRanger. He reprised his role on one more occasion in the Super Sentai teamup, Hurricanger vs Gaoranger in 2003. His older brother, Kazuma Horie, is a voice actor.

Filmography

Acting roles
2004 Ai no Sorea a.k.a. The Stormy Waves of Love; as Kyoichi Ozaki
2003 Jisatsu Manyuaru; a.k.a. Suicide Manual; as Police Detective Nishiyama
2003 Ju-on: The Grudge 2; as Noritaka Yamashita
2001 Hyakujuu Sentai Gaoranger; as Gaku Washio/GaoYellow
1999 Gamera 3: Revenge of Iris; as Shigeki Hinohara
1998 Tomei Shojo Air; as Ryota Kasugai

Stage shows
2021 Kikai Sentai Zenkaiger vs. Hyakujuu Sentai Gaoranger, as Gaku Washio/GaoYellow

Directing
2015 Forget Me Not
2013 Ku no Kyoukai
2012 Sentimental Yasuko
2007 Itsuka no Kimi e
2005 Taga Kokoro Nimo Ryu wa Nemuru
2004 Veronica wa Shinu Koto ni Shita a.k.a. Veronica Decides to Die
2004 Kisu to Kizu
2004 Shibuya Kaidan 2 a.k.a. The Locker 2
2003 Shibuya Kaidan a.k.a. The Locker
2001 Glowing, Growing

Writing
2005 Life on the Longboard

Awards
2002
 Mannheim-Heidelberg International Filmfestival
 Won the Prize of the Ecumenical Jury - Special Mention of the movie, Glowing Growing for his radical analysis of the sensitive subject 'suicide of the young'. The uncompromising way the narration is offered encourages us to debate.

2001
 Vancouver International Film Festival
 Won the Dragons and Tigers Award (Special Mention) of the movie, Glowing Growing
 Nominated for the Dragons and Tigers Award of the movie, Glowing Growing

External links
CORNFLAKES Kei Horie's Official Site

 

1978 births
Living people
Japanese male actors
Japanese film directors